Richfield is an unincorporated community in Richfield Township, Adams County, Illinois, United States. Richfield is east of Payson.

Demographics

References

Unincorporated communities in Adams County, Illinois
Unincorporated communities in Illinois